The 2006 Icelandic Men's Football League Cup was the 11th staging of the Icelandic Men's League Cup, a pre-season professional football competition in Iceland. The competition started on 17 February 2006  and concluded on 3 May 2006 with FH beating Keflavík 3-2 in the final.

Details
 The 16 teams were divided into 2 groups of 8 teams. Each team plays one match with other teams in the group once. The top 2 teams from each group qualified for the semi-finals.

Group stage

Group A

Group B

Knockout stage

Semi-finals

Final

See also
Icelandic Men's Football Cup
Knattspyrnusamband Íslands - The Icelandic Football Association
Icelandic First Division League 2006

References
RSSSF Page - Deildabikar 2006

2006 domestic association football cups
2006 in Icelandic football
Icelandic Men's Football League Cup